Golovino is a rural locality (a village) in Nagornoye Rural Settlement, Petushinsky District, Vladimir Oblast, Russia. The population was 278 as of 2010. There are 3 streets.

Geography 
Golovino is located on the Volga River, 31 km northwest of Petushki (the district's administrative centre) by road. Vyalovo is the nearest rural locality.

References 

Rural localities in Petushinsky District